Colin Seymour (born 27 October 1953) is a British rower. He competed in the men's coxed four event at the 1980 Summer Olympics. In 1977 he was part of the eight that reached the final and finished 5th, at the 1977 World Rowing Championships in Amsterdam.

References

External links
 

1953 births
Living people
British male rowers
Olympic rowers of Great Britain
Rowers at the 1980 Summer Olympics